Gennadi (Gaur) Yakovlevich Afanasyev (1 January 1943 – 10 March 2003) was a Russian football manager and a player.

References

1943 births
2003 deaths
Soviet footballers
Association football midfielders
FC Irtysh Omsk players
FC Sibir Novosibirsk players
Russian football managers
FC Zhemchuzhina Sochi managers
Russian Premier League managers